Kathuru Mithuru is an upcoming Sri Lankan Sinhala comedy film directed by Giriraj Kaushalya and produced by Basuru Siriwardena for Alankulama Films. The film stars Jayalath Manoratne and Mahendra Perera in lead role whereas Rodney Warnakula and Priyantha Seneviratne made supportive roles.

Plot
Wilson and Samson are best friends that bond goes beyond blood ties. Wilson is a traditional barber. Samson is a traditional tailor. Wilson has a daughter. Samson has a son. Both of them come to the village after completing their university education due to lack of employment opportunities for their education. Finally they try to get involved in their fathers' jobs. But Wilson and Samson's intention is to see their daughter and son do a highly regarded job in the administrative service. In time, the son and daughter finally turned to barber and tailor careers like their fathers. Unlike their fathers, the daughter and son begin to follow a different path, changing tradition.

Cast
 Jayalath Manoratne as Samson, the tailor
 Mahendra Perera as Wilson, the barber
 Rodney Warnakula as Wilson's assistant 
 Priyantha Seneviratne as Samson's assistant 
 Maureen Charuni
 Jayani Senanayake
 Mihira Sirithilaka
 D. B. Gangodathenna
 Gihan Fernando
 Sahan Ranwala
 Sandani Hettiarachchi as Wilson's daughter
 Rasanjana Nandasiri as Samson's son
 Wasantha Vittachchi
 Ananda Athukorala
 Sampath Jayaweera 
 Lalith Jayakantha as Money lender
 Chandrasoma Binduhewa
 Daya Wayaman
 Nimal Yatiwella
 S. I. Samarakkody
 Saman Hemaratne
 Upatissa Balasuriya
 Shiromika Fernando
 Sudara Randini
 Gamini Ambalangoda
 Rupa Pathirana
 Nimal Jayasinghe

Production
Basuru Siriwardena has produced the film for Alankulama Films as his maiden film production. Creative design and sponsorship for film was given by Jayaprakash Sivagurunathan. The song lyrics penned by Bandara Eheliyagoda, Nilar N. Kasim, Achala Solomons whereas songs sung by Amarasiri Peiris, Amandya Uthpali, Tharaka Gunaratne, Jayalath Manoratne, Mahendra Perera, Rodney Warnakula, and Priyantha Seneviratne. Rasanjana Nandasiri, the son of late actor Vijaya Nandasiri also made his film debut. The film has been shot in and around Mawanella.

Release
Even though the film was scheduled to release in December 2020 in CEL theatres, it was delayed due to sudden illnesses caused for lead actor Jayalath Manoratne and director Giriraj Kaushalya. The trailer for the film has been released online in March 2020. The film had a special screening on the 5 September 2020 at the Liberty Cinema Hall, Colombo during the second day of the Scope Film Festival. It was also possible to screen the highest number of screenings in a single day in a foreign country for a Sri Lankan film, where the film screened in both Australia and Canada.

The film received positive reviews from critics for acting, plot and background. However, the love song scenario and the fight scene received negative reviews.

References

External links
 
 Official trailer
 Kathuru Mithuru 

Sinhala-language films
Sri Lankan romantic drama films